Eduard Mihai Drăgușin (born 5 January 1984) is a Romanian water polo goalkeeper. At the 2012 Summer Olympics, he competed for the Romania men's national water polo team in the men's event. He also competed at the 2011 World Aquatics Championships. He is 6 ft 2 inches tall.

See also
 Romania men's Olympic water polo team records and statistics
 List of men's Olympic water polo tournament goalkeepers

References

External links
 

1984 births
Living people
Romanian male water polo players
Water polo goalkeepers
Olympic water polo players of Romania
Water polo players at the 2012 Summer Olympics